The cellular apoptosis susceptibility protein (CAS) is an exportin which in the nucleus is bound to RanGTP.

Function 

The Cas family of proteins are a family of proteins that induce cellular apoptosis and cell proliferation. Apoptosis is a specialized sequence of events that a cell can induce for programmed death. Cas is a 2 terminal protein, a N-terminal and a C-terminal, and there is a positive correlation between the presence of CAS and the degree of cellular proliferation. ALong with this correlation, in the absence of the CAS protein in a cell, there is an inhibition of apoptosis Along with being an inducer of apoptosis, CAS also plays a role in being a checkpoint for cell cycle. Without the CAS protein, a cell will not be able to go beyond the G2 phase. It is in the nucleus of the cell, where its exportin function comes into play.

The Cas family of proteins can be divided into 4 functional domains: expression, interference, adaption, and ancillary. The expression domain help with crRNA binding and with binding of targets. The interference module helps with the cleave of a target. The adaption domain helps with spacer acquisition. Lastly, the ancillary domain helps with regulation of the gene and other CRISPR functions.

The CRISPR-Cas family of protein is also divided into 3 different types, Type I, Type II, Type III. Each of the 3 types of CRISPR-Cas are characterized by a specific gene; Type I: Cas3, Type II: Cas 9, Type III: Cas 10.

See also
 Nuclear_pore#Import_of_proteins

References

External links